The Algerian Coffee Stores is a coffee shop in Old Compton Street in the Soho neighborhood of London, England.  Founded in 1887, it is the oldest coffee shop in London.

It was founded in 1887 by M. Siari, an Algerian, at number 52 Old Compton Street. It is still known as among the world's best leading suppliers of tea and coffee, and remains up to now one of the oldest shops in the street.

It is situated next to the famous Admiral Duncan pub, which has been trading since at least 1832.

References

External links 
 History of the Algerian Coffee Stores at the Algerian Coffee Stores website

Shops in London
1887 establishments in England